James Earl Ray (March 10, 1928 – April 23, 1998) was an American fugitive convicted for assassinating Martin Luther King Jr. at the Lorraine Motel in Memphis, Tennessee, on April 4, 1968. After this, Ray was on the run and was captured in the UK. Ray was convicted in 1969 after entering a guilty plea—thus forgoing a jury trial and the possibility of a death sentence—and was sentenced to 99 years of imprisonment.

Early life and education
Ray was born on March 10, 1928, in Alton, Illinois, the son of Lucille Ray (née Maher) and George Ellis Ray. He had Irish, Scottish and Welsh ancestry and had a Catholic upbringing.

In February 1935, Ray's father, known by the nickname Speedy, passed a bad check in Alton, Illinois, and then moved to Ewing, Missouri, where the family changed their name to Raynes to avoid law enforcement. James Earl Ray was the oldest of nine children, including John Larry Ray, Franklin Ray, Jerry William Ray, Melba Ray, Carol Ray Pepper, Suzan Ray, and Marjorie Ray. His sister Marjorie died in a fire as a young child in 1933. Ray left school at the age of 12. He later joined the U.S. Army at the close of World War II and served in Germany. Ray struggled to adapt to military life and was eventually discharged for ineptitude and lack of adaptability in 1948.

Initial convictions and first escape from prison
Ray committed a variety of crimes prior to the murder of King. Ray's first conviction for criminal activity, a burglary in California, came in 1949. In 1952, he served two years for the armed robbery of a taxi driver in Illinois. In 1955, he was convicted of mail fraud after stealing money orders in Hannibal, Missouri. For this, he was imprisoned for four years in the federal United States Penitentiary Leavenworth. In 1959, he was caught stealing $120 in an armed robbery of a Kroger store in St. Louis. He was sentenced to twenty years in prison for repeated offenses. He escaped from the Missouri State Penitentiary in 1967 by hiding in a truck transporting bread from the prison bakery.

Post first escape 
Following his escape, Ray stayed on the move throughout the United States and Canada, going first to St. Louis and then onward to Chicago, Toronto, Montreal, and Birmingham, Alabama, where he stayed long enough to buy a 1966 Ford Mustang and get an Alabama driver’s license. He then drove to Mexico, stopping in Acapulco before settling in Puerto Vallarta on October 19, 1967.

While in Mexico, Ray, using the alias Eric Starvo Galt, attempted to establish himself as a pornographic film director. Using mail-ordered equipment, he filmed and photographed local prostitutes. Frustrated with his results and jilted by the prostitute with whom he had formed a relationship, Ray left Mexico on or around November 16, 1967,  arriving in Los Angeles three days later. While there, Ray attended a local bartending school and took dance lessons. His chief interest, however, was the George Wallace presidential campaign. Ray was white and was quickly drawn to Wallace's segregationist platform. He spent much of his time in Los Angeles volunteering at the Wallace campaign headquarters in North Hollywood.

He considered emigrating to Rhodesia (now Zimbabwe), where a predominantly white minority regime had unilaterally assumed independence from the United Kingdom in 1965. The notion of living in Rhodesia continued to appeal to Ray for several years afterwards, and it was his intended destination after King's assassination. The Rhodesian government expressed its disapproval.

Activity in early 1968
On March 5, 1968, Ray underwent a rhinoplasty, performed by physician Russell Hadley. On March 18, 1968, Ray left Los Angeles and began a cross-country drive to Atlanta, Georgia.

Arriving in Atlanta on March 24, 1968, Ray checked into a rooming house. He bought a map of the city. FBI agents later found this map when they searched the room in which he was staying. On the map, the locations of the church and residence of Martin Luther King Jr. were circled.

Ray was soon on the road again and drove his Mustang to Birmingham, Alabama. There, on March 30, 1968, he bought a Remington Model 760 Gamemaster .30-06-caliber rifle and a box of 20 cartridges from the Aeromarine Supply Company. He also bought a Redfield 2x-7x scope, which he had mounted to the rifle. He told the store owners that he was going on a hunting trip with his brother. Ray had continued using the Galt alias after his stint in Mexico, but when he made this purchase, he gave his name as Harvey Lowmeyer.

After purchasing the rifle and accessories, Ray drove back to Atlanta. An avid newspaper reader, Ray passed his time reading The Atlanta Constitution. The paper reported King's planned return trip to Memphis, Tennessee, which was scheduled for 1st April, 1968. On 2nd April, 1968, Ray packed a bag and drove to Memphis.

Assassination of Martin Luther King Jr.

According to the FBI, on 4th April, 1968 Ray killed civil rights activist Martin Luther King Jr. with a single shot fired from his Remington rifle, while King was standing on the second-floor balcony of the Lorraine Motel in Memphis, Tennessee. Shortly after the shot was fired, witnesses saw Ray fleeing from a rooming house across the street from the motel where he had been renting a room. A package was abandoned close to the site that included a rifle and binoculars, both found with Ray's fingerprints.

Apprehension and plea
Ray fled to Atlanta in his white Ford Mustang, driving eleven hours. He picked up his belongings and fled north to Canada, arriving in Toronto three days later, where he hid for over a month and acquired a Canadian passport under the false name of Ramon George Sneyd. He left Toronto in late May on a flight to England. He stayed briefly in Lisbon, Portugal, and returned to London. Ray was then arrested at London Heathrow Airport attempting to leave the United Kingdom for Brussels. He was trying to depart the United Kingdom for Angola, Rhodesia, or apartheid South Africa using the falsified Canadian passport. At check-in, the ticket agent noticed the name on his passport, Sneyd, was on a Royal Canadian Mounted Police watchlist.

Airport officials noticed that Ray carried another passport under a second name. The UK quickly extradited Ray to Tennessee, where he was charged with King's murder. He confessed to the crime on March 10, 1969, his 41st birthday, and after pleading guilty he was sentenced to 99 years in prison.

Recanting of confession
Three days later, Ray recanted his confession. He had entered a guilty plea on the advice of his attorney, Percy Foreman, to avoid the sentence of death by electrocution, which would have been a possible outcome of a jury trial. Unbeknownst to Ray, however, a death sentence would have been commuted as unconstitutional under the de facto moratorium in place since 1967 and following Furman v. Georgia.

Ray dismissed Foreman as his attorney and thereafter derisively called him "Percy Fourflusher."  Ray began claiming that a man he had met in Montreal back in 1967, who used the alias "Raul," had been involved in the assassination. And he asserted that he did not "personally shoot Dr. King," but may have been "partially responsible without knowing it," hinting at a conspiracy.  Ray told this version of the assassination and his flight during the following two months to journalist William Bradford Huie.

Huie investigated this story and discovered that Ray lied about some details. Ray told Huie that he purposefully left the rifle with his fingerprints on it in plain sight at the crime scene because he wanted to become a famous criminal. He was convinced that he would escape capture because of his intelligence and cunning, and he also believed that Governor of Alabama George Wallace would soon be elected to the presidency, so that Ray would only be confined in prison for a short time, pending a presidential pardon by Wallace. However, Ray spent the remainder of his life unsuccessfully attempting to withdraw his guilty plea and secure a jury trial.

Second escape from prison
On June 10, 1977, Ray and six other convicts escaped from Brushy Mountain State Penitentiary in Petros, Tennessee. They were recaptured on June 13. A year was added to Ray's previous sentence, increasing it to a full century.

Conspiracy allegations

House Select Committee on Assassinations

Ray hired Jack Kershaw as his new attorney, and Kershaw publicly argued and promoted Ray's claim that he was not responsible for the assassination of King. His claim was that the assassination was the result of a conspiracy of the otherwise unidentified man named "Raul” who was a blonde Cuban. Kershaw and his client met with representatives of the United States House Select Committee on Assassinations (HSCA) and convinced the committee to conduct ballistics tests that they believed would prove Ray had not fired the fatal shot. The tests ultimately proved inconclusive. 

Kershaw claimed the prison escape was additional proof that Ray had been involved in a conspiracy that had provided him with the outside assistance he would have needed to break out of prison. Kershaw convinced Ray to submit to a polygraph test as part of an interview with Playboy. The magazine reported that the test results showed "Ray did, in fact, kill Martin Luther King Jr. and that he did so alone."  Ray then fired Kershaw after discovering the attorney had been paid $11,000 by the magazine in exchange for the interview and instead hired attorney Mark Lane to provide him with legal representation.

Mock trial and civil suit

In 1997, King's son, Dexter, met with Ray at the prison and asked him, "I just want to ask you, for the record, did you kill my father?" Ray replied, "No. No I didn't." Dexter told Ray that he, along with the rest of the King family, believed Ray, and the family also urged publicly that Ray be granted a new trial. William Pepper, a friend of King during the last year of his life, represented Ray in a mock trial televised by HBO in an attempt to grant him the trial he never received. In the mock trial, the prosecutor was Hickman Ewing. The mock trial jury finally acquitted Ray.

In 1998, and continuing into 1999, Pepper represented the King family in a wrongful death civil suit against Memphis restaurant owner Loyd Jowers, whose restaurant was near the Lorraine Motel. They sued Jowers for participation in a conspiracy to murder King. Rendering their verdict on December 8 of that year, the jury found that Jowers and others, including government agencies, had conspired to murder King, and he was therefore legally liable to pay compensation to the King family. The family accepted $100 in restitution to demonstrate they were not pursuing the case for financial gain, and they publicly stated that Ray, in their opinion, had nothing to do with the assassination. 

Coretta Scott King said, "The jury was clearly convinced by the extensive evidence that was presented during the trial that, in addition to Mr. Jowers, the conspiracy of the Mafia, local, state and federal government agencies, were deeply involved in the assassination of my husband. The jury also affirmed overwhelming evidence that identified someone else, not James Earl Ray, as the shooter, and that Mr. Ray was set up to take the blame."

Prompted by the King family's acceptance of some of the claims of conspiracy, United States Attorney General Janet Reno ordered a new investigation on August 26, 1998. On June 9, 2000, the United States Department of Justice released a 150-page report rejecting allegations that there was a conspiracy to assassinate King, including the determination of the Memphis civil court jury.

Death
Before his death, Ray was transferred to the Lois M. DeBerry Special Needs Facility in Nashville, a maximum-security prison with hospital facilities.

Ray died on April 23, 1998, at the age of 70, at the Columbia Memorial Hospital from complications related to kidney disease and liver failure caused by hepatitis C. His brother, Jerry, told CNN that his brother did not want to be buried or have his final resting place in the United States because of the way the government had framed him for living. His body was cremated and his ashes were flown to Ireland, the home of his maternal family's ancestors. 

Ten years later, Ray's other brother, John Larry Ray, co-authored a book with Lyndon Barsten titled Truth At Last: The Untold Story Behind James Earl Ray and the Assassination of Martin Luther King Jr.

References

Sources

Further reading
 Green, Jim. Blood and Dishonor on a Badge of Honor.
 Heathrow, John. Why Did He Do It?
 McMillan, George. The Making of an Assassin. 
 Melanson, Dr. Philip H. The Martin Luther King Assassination: New Revelations on the Conspiracy and Cover-Up, 1968–1991. 
 Pepper, William F. An Act of State: The Execution of Martin Luther King. 
 Petras, Kathryn, and Ross Petras (2003). Unusually Stupid Americans: A Compendium of All-American Stupidity. New York: Villard. p. 76. .
 Posner, Gerald. Killing the Dream: James Earl Ray and the Assassination of Martin Luther King, Jr. 
 Ray, James Earl with Tupper Saussy. Tennessee Waltz: The Making of a Political Prisoner. 
 Ray, James Earl (1992). Who Killed Martin Luther King?: The True Story by the Alleged Assassin. Washington: National Press Books. .

External links
 Roads to Memphis (American Experience, first aired Monday, May 3, 2010) – Public Broadcasting System (PBS).

1928 births
1998 deaths
American assassins
American people convicted of burglary
American escapees
American people convicted of murder
American people convicted of robbery
American people who died in prison custody
Deaths from hepatitis
Escapees from Missouri detention
Escapees from Tennessee detention
FBI Ten Most Wanted Fugitives
Forgers
Criminals from Illinois
People convicted of murder by Tennessee
People extradited from the United Kingdom to the United States
People from Alton, Illinois
Prisoners who died in Tennessee detention
Military personnel from Illinois
United States Army soldiers
United States Army personnel of World War II
20th-century American criminals
Assassination of Martin Luther King Jr.
American male criminals
American criminal snipers
American white supremacists
White supremacist assassins
Male murderers
American people of Scotch-Irish descent
Deaths from kidney disease
Deaths from liver failure
Infectious disease deaths in Tennessee